Olympia Handball Club London is a handball club from London, England that has men’s and women’s teams competing in the Premier Handball League, Regional Development League and a number of Junior leagues.

Club history 
The club was established in 2005 as a multi-national team and remains one of the most diverse handball clubs in London, now boasting members from more than 23 countries.

In addition to providing an opportunity for everyone to play handball, Olympia has four senior teams that participate in England Handball Association (EHA) leagues and cup competitions at different levels. Both of the Women and Men's first teams compete in the Premier Handball League, which is contested between the best teams in England. Olympia's second teams participate in the Development League (second tier) for men and women. The club also takes part in domestic handball cup competitions, as well as international tournaments such as the EHF Challenge Cup, EHF Cup, British Beach Handball, Liverpool Handball Festival, and several other friendly tournaments around Europe.

At junior level, Olympia is proud of its involvement with a satellite club at All Saints Catholic School in Dagenham, East London -  pupils compete at national school level, and also have the chance to play for the Under-18 Juniors team.

Women's PHL Team

Honours 

 Premier Handball League
 Winners (6) : 2012/13, 2013/14, 2014/2015, 2015/2016, 2016/17, 2018/2019
 Runners-Up (1) :, 2017/18

 English National Handball Cup
 Winners (2) : 2013/14, 2015/16

European Record

2019/20 Squad 

Head Coach
  Aurelian Gug

Goalkeepers
  Sabrina Farhan
  Zooey Perry

Wingers
 - RW
  Jessica Gómez Castaño
  Annaleigh Knott 
 - LW 
  Anamaria Andreea Codreanu
  Helen Andersson
  Denisa Paduraru
Pivots 
  Kerstin Brodin
  Camila Grasso

Backs
 - LB
  Naomi Donkor
  Ingrid-Liv Morkken
  Amanda Hoffner
 - CB 
  Malwina Spek
  Marija Stričević (Captain) 
 - RB
  Lucille Dauwe
  Patricia Einfeldt
  Steffi Hertling
  Tatiana Tavares

Men’s PHL Team

Honours 

 Premier Handball League
 Runners-Up (2) : 2015/16, 2017/18, 2018/19

External links
 Official website
 EHF Club profile

English handball clubs